Qızılqazma (also, Kyzylkazma) is a village in the Shabran Rayon of Azerbaijan.  The village forms part of the municipality of Çuxurazəmi.

References 

Populated places in Shabran District